The 1942 BYU Cougars football team was an American football team that represented Brigham Young University (BYU) as a member of the Mountain States Conference (MSC) during the 1942 college football season. In their first and only season under head coach Floyd Millet, the Cougars compiled an overall record of 2–5 with a mark of 1–4 against conference opponents, tied for sixth in the MSC, and were outscored by a total of 133 to 55.

Schedule

References

BYU
BYU Cougars football seasons
BYU Cougars football